The Libyan League Cup is a Libyan football competition initiated in 2007. The competition sees all members in the Libyan Premier League compete for the trophy. The competition is aimed at giving youth team players and fringe players game time.

2007-08 Edition

Khaleej Sirte won the first edition of the competition, beating Al Akhdar 3-2 in last year's final.

2008-09 Edition

Al-Ittihad won the second edition.

2009-10 Edition

Al-Madina won the third edition.

Football competitions in Libya